Michael R Mazourek is a plant breeder and associate professor at Cornell University notable for developing the honeynut squash, a cultivar of a cross first developed by Cornell University plant breeder Richard W. Robinson, creating the Habanada, and Row 7, a seed company co-founded with Dan Barber of Blue Hill and Matthew Goldfarb.

References

Living people
Cornell University faculty
Year of birth missing (living people)